Major Raja Nadir Pervez Khan (born November 11, 1940) is a Pakistani politician, ex-MP of the Parliament, and former Pakistan Army officer. A former member of the Pakistan Army's 6 Punjab Regiment, Parvez was a minister in the Nawaz Sharif government during his second tenure.  He is the brother-in-law of the former Corps Commander of Quetta Lieutenant-General Tariq Pervez. In a 1999 conversation (with Taimur Khan), he was described by General Tikka Khan, the Pakistani commander in the Rann of Kutch battles in the spring of 1965, as a "brave and courageous soldier." General Tikka Khan recalled how Nadir Pervez captured an Indian patrol while on a reconnaissance mission during the clashes.

Military career
He graduated from the Pakistan Military Academy, Kakul in 1963 and served in Army until 1974. He had served in the army and fought against India in both Indo-Pakistani War of 1965 and the 1971 Indo-Pak Winter War. Major Parvez had posted to East Pakistan and was the Company Commander of the 6 Punjab Regiment troops which had boarded PNS Rajshah, a Pakistan Navy vessel. However, his team had gotten off the vessel and took the position in a designated areas. Major Pervez was inducted in Pakistan Marines Battalion as a weapon specialist. During the conflict, the Maj Raja Nadir Pervez was informed of the attack on PNS Rajshahi, immediately directed an MI-8 helicopter in the vicinity to evacuate the wounded Commanding Officer of Rajshahi and the same was done soon thereafter.

Nadir was awarded the Sitara-e-Jurat for his service in the 1965 war. His efforts in the 1971 war, which included leading an escape from the Indian prison in Fateh Garh (Camp Number 45) along with four other officers, gained him a second Sitara-e-Jurat and promotion to the rank of lieutenant-colonel. In 1974, he was court martialed by the Judge Advocate General Branch of the Pakistan Army "on false charges" and was sentenced to death, but was later acquitted "Honourably".

Political career

He joined the Pakistan Muslim League. He has since been elected Member of National Assembly (MNA) for the terms of 1985–1988, 1990–1993, 1993–1997, 1997–1999 and 2002-2007. He has also served as Federal Minister for Interior during 1987–1988; Minister of State for Water and Power during 1991–1993 and Federal Minister for the Communications during 1997–1999.
He left PML-N on April 2, 2013 on the grounds of grievances over the allotment of party tickets in Faisalabad. Almost a month later, on May 5, he joined Pakistan Tehreek-e-Insaf in a public gathering [jalsa] in Faisalabad.

References

1942 births
Living people
Punjabi people
People from Faisalabad
Pakistan Military Academy alumni
Punjab Regiment officers
Special Services Group officers
Pakistan Army officers
Pakistan Marines
Pakistan Muslim League (N) politicians
Recipients of Sitara-e-Jurat
Pakistani prisoners of war
Cadet College Hasan Abdal alumni
Pakistanis named in the Pandora Papers